Marj Sanur (translation: "Sanur Valley"; also called Marj al-Ghuruq, translation: "Drowning Valley" is a closed basin within the northern mountains of the West Bank, located entirely in the southern Jenin Governorate, in between the cities of Jenin (to the north) and Nablus (to the south). Its total area is roughly 20 square kilometers, while its drainage basin is about 55 square kilometers, most of which is in the Jenin Governorate, with two square kilometers extending into the Tubas Governorate. Marj Sanur abuts the Qabatiya Mountains to the north, the Zawiya Hills to the west and the Musheirif Highlands to the south. Further to the northwest is the Sahl Arraba valley and further to the east, past the towns of Aqqaba and Tubas, is the Jordan Valley.

Marj Sanur's maximum length is 7.5 kilometers and maximum width is 3.5 kilometers. The average elevation in the valley is between 350 and 360 meters above sea level, with the highest elevation at 370 meters and the lowest elevation at 348 meters. Surrounding the valley on all sides are mountains and hills with a range of elevation from 450 meters above sea level to Mount Hureish, which has an elevation of 764 meters above sea level. Marj Sanur is also a seasonal lake, usually between December and April, as the basin has no drainage outlet. It typically becomes flooded when rainfall is higher than 600 millimeters per year. There are five entrances into Marj Sanur.

In Arabic, marj translates as the "fertile valley" or "meadow". The valley is named after the village of Sanur, one of seven Palestinian villages that border the valley. The other six villages are Meithalun, Siris, al-Judeida, Sir, Misilyah and Zawiya. Meithalun is the largest village around the valley and it has the largest share of Marj Sanur's land. The larger towns of Qabatiya and Jenin are located further north of Marj Sanur.

References

Bibliography

 

Bodies of water of the West Bank
Valleys of the West Bank
Jenin Governorate
Valleys of Asia